The Montenegrin Rugby Union is the governing body for rugby union in Montenegro. It was founded in 2013, and became affiliated to Rugby Europe in 2014.

National Teams
The Montenegro rugby union are in charge of:
Montenegro national rugby union team - the national men's team.
Montenegro national rugby sevens team - the national men's seven-a-side team.
Montenegro national women's rugby sevens team - the national women's seven-a-side team.

Coaching staff
The current coaching staff appointed by the union are:

See also
Rugby union in Montenegro
 List of National Team Players

References

External links
Montenegrin Rugby Federation - Official Site

Rugby union in Montenegro
Montenegro
Sports organizations established in 2013